The natural unit of information (symbol: nat), sometimes also nit  or nepit, is a unit of information, based on natural logarithms and powers of e, rather than the powers of 2 and base 2 logarithms, which define the shannon. This unit is also known by its unit symbol, the nat.  One nat is the information content of an event when the probability of that event occurring is 1/e.

One nat is equal to  shannons ≈ 1.44 Sh or, equivalently,  hartleys ≈ 0.434 Hart.

History 
Boulton and Wallace used the term nit in conjunction with minimum message length, which was subsequently changed by the minimum description length community to nat to avoid confusion with the nit used as a unit of luminance.

Alan Turing used the natural ban.

Entropy 
Shannon entropy (information entropy), being the expected value of the information of an event, is a quantity of the same type and with the same units as information. Physical systems of natural units that normalize the Boltzmann constant to 1 are effectively measuring thermodynamic entropy in nats.

When the Shannon entropy is written using a natural logarithm,

it is implicitly giving a number measured in nats.

Notes

References

Further reading 

Units of information